Heteropsis erebina is a butterfly in the family Nymphalidae. It is found in northern Madagascar. The habitat consists of forests and forest margins.

References

Elymniini
Butterflies described in 1916
Endemic fauna of Madagascar
Butterflies of Africa
Taxa named by Charles Oberthür